"Lessness" is a short story by Samuel Beckett originally written in French as "Sans" in 1969, and later translated into English by the author.  It was partly inspired by John Cage and the experimental music of the 1960s.  The story was included in a book of short stories under the title Friendship launched in 1990 to coincide with the fourth anniversary of the kidnapping in Beirut of the British television journalist John McCarthy.

References

1969 short stories
Short stories by Samuel Beckett